Poland competed at the 2018 Winter Olympics in Pyeongchang, South Korea, from 9 to 25 February 2018. It was the nation's 23rd appearance at the Winter Olympics, having competed at every Games since their inception in 1924. The Polish team consisted of 62 athletes in 12 sports, which is the largest ever Polish team, surpassing the 59 athletes that competed in 2014. Polish ski jumpers won one gold and one bronze medal, earning the 20th place at the medal table.

Medalists

Competitors

The following is the list of number of competitors participating at the Games per sport/discipline.

Alpine skiing 

Poland qualified three athletes, two males and one female.

Biathlon 

Based on their Nations Cup ranking in the 2016–17 Biathlon World Cup, Poland has qualified 5 women  and 2 men.

Men

Women

Mixed

Bobsleigh 

Based on their Nations Cup ranking in the 2017–18 Bobsleigh World Cup, Poland has qualified Two man and Four man received the reallocated quota place. 

* – Denotes the driver of each sled

Cross-country skiing 

Poland qualified six athletes, two male and two female and two yet to be determined.

Men

Women

Sprint

Figure skating 

Poland qualified one ice dancing pair, based on its placement at the 2017 World Figure Skating Championships in Helsinki, Finland. This marks the country's reappearance in the sport at the Winter Olympics, after missing the last edition in 2014.

Freestyle skiing 

According to the quota allocation released on 22 January 2018, Poland qualified one athlete. On February 10, 2018 was announced that Karolina Riemen-Żerebecka won't be able to compete in the Games due to surgery of her spine.

Ski cross

Luge 

Based on the results from the fall World Cups during the 2017–18 Luge World Cup season, Poland earned the following start quotas:

Mixed team relay

Nordic combined

Poland qualified four athletes and a spot in the team relay.

Short track speed skating 

Poland has qualified one skater for men's 500 m events and two skaters for women's 500 m, 1000 m and 1500 m events for the Olympics during the four World Cup events in November 2017.

Qualification legend: ADV – Advanced due to being impeded by another skater; FA – Qualify to medal round; FB – Qualify to consolation round

Ski jumping 

According to the quota allocation released on 22 January 2018, Poland qualified five athletes. However Piotr Żyła did not start in any.

Snowboarding 

According to the quota allocation released on 22 January 2018, Poland qualified five athletes.

Parallel

Snowboard cross

Speed skating 

Based on the results from the fall World Cups during the 2017–18 ISU Speed Skating World Cup season, Poland earned the following start quotas:

Men

Women

Mass start

Team pursuit

References

Nations at the 2018 Winter Olympics
2018
Winter Olympics